Albion railway station was a railway station  in England, built by the London and North Western Railway on their Stour Valley Line in 1852. It served the town of Oldbury, and was located near to Union Road.

History
Opened by the Birmingham, Wolverhampton and Stour Valley Railway, then absorbed into the London and North Western Railway, it became part of the London, Midland and Scottish Railway during the Grouping of 1923. The line then passed on to the London Midland Region of British Railways on nationalisation in 1948. The station was then closed by the British Transport Commission.

The site today
The station closed in 1960, although the Rugby-Birmingham-Stafford Line loop from the West Coast Main Line still runs through the site of the station today.

There is little evidence of the location of the station on the ground today; Oldbury is now served by Sandwell and Dudley railway station.

References

 
 
 
 Station on navigable O.S. map

Disused railway stations in Sandwell
Railway stations in Great Britain opened in 1853
Railway stations in Great Britain closed in 1960
Oldbury, West Midlands